Miss Brazil World 2008 was the 19th edition of the Miss Brazil World pageant and 3rd under MMB Productions & Events. The contest took place on July 26, 2008. Ten contestants, that competed in both 2006 and 2007 editions were selected to compete in this years contest. Regiane Andrade of Santa Catarina crowned Tamara Almeida of Minas Gerais at the end of the contest. Almeida represented Brazil at Miss World 2008. The contest was held at the Eco Resort in Angra dos Reis, Rio de Janeiro, Brazil.

Results

Special Awards

Challenge Events

Beach Beauty Brazil

Contestants
The contestants for Miss Brazil World 2008 were:

 Campos dos Goytacazes, Rio de Janeiro - Nayara Lima
 - Aline Avancini
 Jandaia do Sul, Paraná - Amanda Bocchi
 Maringá, Paraná - Anelize Garcia
 - Tamara Almeida
 - Leila Roots
 - Renata Lustosa
 - Geise Werzenska
 São Gonçalo, Rio de Janeiro - Alessandra Lopes
 Umuarama, Paraná - Vivian Noronha

References

External links
 Official site (in Portuguese)

2008
2008 in Brazil
2008 beauty pageants